Lepidocephalichthys hasselti is a species of cobitid loach native to southeastern Asia and western Indonesia.  This species reaches a length of  TL.

Named in honor of Dutch physician and biologist Johan Coenraad van Hasselt (1797-1823), who while exploring the colonial Dutch East Indies in 1820 provided an illustration of this species.
Hasselt traveled with his friend Heinrich Kuhl.

Diagnosis 
According to Kottelat & Lim 1992, L. hasselti is distinguished from other described species of Lepidocephalichthys in Southeast Asia in usually having an ocellated black spot centered at base of branched caudal rays 3-4; or it replaced by black or darker area. Its size is up to 45 mm SL;  body with a median longitudinal stripe or a row of adjacent black spots, with an unpigmented stripe above it, back marmorated, finely spotted or blotched.  Caudal fin with series (usually 3-6) of vertical bars;  dorsal origin above posterior extremity of pelvic base.

Range and conservation status 
It has a widespread distribution:  Burma, Thailand, Laos, Cambodia, Vietnam, and Yunnan;  southward through Peninsular Malaysia to western Indonesia (Sumatra, Borneo and Java).  IUCN listed it as LC (Least Concern).

Footnotes

External links 

 ADW:  Lepidocephalichthys hasselti
 FIMSEA (Fish of Mainland Southeast Asia):  Lepidocephalichthys hasselti (CYPRINIFORMES: Cobitidae).  Photos of specimens:  IFREDI-P00855, IFREDI-P02600, IFREDI-P03039, IFREDI-P03191. 
 Loaches OL:  Lepidocephalichthys hasselti

Cobitidae
Fish of Indonesia
Taxa named by Achille Valenciennes
Fish described in 1846
Fish of Southeast Asia